The Saint Fructuosus Cathedral is the main Roman Catholic church building of Tacuarembó, Uruguay. It is the see of the Roman Catholic Diocese of Tacuarembó since 1960.

History
The original church was established on 30 August 1834. Originally it was a very humble ranch with thatched roof. 

The present temple, built in Romanesque Revival style, was consecrated in 1917. The clock is operational since 1930. 

Declared a National Monument, this temple is dedicated to saint Fructuosus of Tarragona.

See also
 List of Roman Catholic cathedrals in Uruguay
 Roman Catholic Diocese of Tacuarembó

References

External links
 Diocese of Tacuarembó - CEU 
 Blog devoted to the Cathedral of Tacuarembó 
 

Roman Catholic church buildings in Tacuarembó Department
Tacuarembo
Roman Catholic churches completed in 1917
Romanesque Revival church buildings in Uruguay
20th-century Roman Catholic church buildings in Uruguay